St. Mary Historic District or St. Marys Historic District, and variations with Church and otherwise, may refer to:

 St. Marys Historic District (St. Marys, Georgia)
St. Mary's College Historic District, St. Mary, Kentucky, listed on the National Register of Historic Places
St. Mary Historic District (Lafayette, Indiana)
St. Mary's Catholic Church Historic District (Dubuque, Iowa)
St. Mary's Catholic Church Historic District (Guttenberg, Iowa)
St. Marys City Historic District, St. Marys City, Maryland
St. Mary's Church Complex Historic District, Monroe, Michigan
St. Mary's of the Barrens Historic District, Perryville, Missouri, listed on the National Register of Historic Places
St. Mary Utility Area Historic District, St. Mary, Montana
St. Mary's Church Non-Contiguous Historic District, Hague, North Dakota
St. Marys Historic District (St. Marys, Pennsylvania)

See also
 St. Mary's Academy Historic District (disambiguation)